Chandler Swope is a Republican member of the West Virginia Senate, representing the 6th district since January 11, 2017.

Election results

References

1942 births
Living people
People from Bluefield, West Virginia
People from Welch, West Virginia
Republican Party West Virginia state senators
Ohio State University alumni
21st-century American politicians